Folly Bridge is a stone bridge over the River Thames carrying the Abingdon Road south from the centre of Oxford, England. It was erected in 1825–27, to designs of a little-known architect, Ebenezer Perry (died 1850), who practised in London.

The bridge is in two parts separated by an island. The origin of the name is uncertain although it has been suggested that it originated about 1650 after a tenant of Bacon's study.

History

The bridge apparently stands at the site of the ford over which oxen could be driven across the Isis, the ancient name of the Thames in the Oxford area. The first known stone bridge on the site was built by Robert d'Oilli in around 1085, but there was believed to be a wooden bridge in the time of Ethelred of Wessex. Remains of the Saxon structure may still be seen beneath the present bridge.

Until the late 17th century the bridge was known as South Bridge, and formed part of a long causeway known as Grandpont, which stretched along most of the line of Abingdon Road. In the 13th century, the alchemist Roger Bacon lived and worked at "Friar Bacon's Study" which stood across the north end of the bridge until 1779, when it was removed to widen the road. Samuel Pepys visited Bacon's study in 1669, noting: "So to Friar Bacon's study: I up and saw it, and gave the man 1s". In 1369, when there was a grant of pontage on "Grauntpount", the structure was said to be "so dangerous as to be well nigh impassable".

A toll-booth gateway tower used to straddle the approach to the bridge, which was on the Abingdon to Banbury turnpike. The former bridge and "Bacon's Tower" were drawn by many artists, including the twelve-year-old J. M. W. Turner.

There was also a weir underneath the bridge which had a flash lock and later a "pen" lock. At the beginning of the 19th century this and the poor state of the bridge itself constituted a problem for navigation. Surveys discovered that the foundations were in a very bad state, and in 1815 an Act of Parliament was obtained to rebuild the bridge and remove the "Tackle and Works" underneath. The new bridge works were begun in 1824 and completed in 1827. A pound lock was established nearby in about 1832, which was removed in 1884. The bridge is Grade I listed.

The toll house was rebuilt in 1844 and is now, along with the bridge, also Grade II listed; tolls on the bridge were abolished in 1850. A scheme for a public footbridge next to the bridge was designed by Nicholas Grimshaw & Partners but was not built.

Environs

Robert Gunther, the historian of science, bought 5 Folly Bridge, an unusual castellated house by the bridge, in 1911. The house is embellished with statues and cast iron balconies on the outside. It is located on a small island in the middle of the Thames.

Salters Steamers are located near the bridge. Punts are available close to the bridge and Christ Church Meadow is just downstream. The Head of the River public house is next to the bridge to the northeast, with views of the bridge and river.

Literature 
Alice's Adventures in Wonderland originated as a story told on a boating trip which began at Folly Bridge.

The novel Folly Bridge: A Romantic Tale was written by David Leslie Murray and published in 1945.
The 1970 book Last Boat to Folly Bridge was written by the sailor Eric C. Hiscock.

See also 
 Crossings of the River Thames
 St Aldate's, to the north

References

External links 
 Folly Bridge drawing, 1896
 Toll House at Folly Bridge
 
 

Bridges across the River Thames
Bridges completed in 1826
Bridges in Oxford
Road bridges in England
Deck arch bridges
Former toll bridges in England
Grade II listed bridges
Grade II listed buildings in Oxfordshire
1826 establishments in England